In Thailand, the banks are governed by the Bank of Thailand, which was established in 1942. Across Thailand, there are thirty licensed banks which are registered with a further six being state-owned. In total they have a combined assets of 26.268 trillion baht (~ US$835.25 Billion) as of June 2019.

Central bank
 Bank of Thailand

State-owned banks
 Government Savings Bank
 GH Bank
 Bank for Agriculture and Agricultural Co-operatives (BAAC)
 Export–Import Bank of Thailand
 Islamic Bank of Thailand
 SME Development Bank of Thailand

Thai commercial and retail banks

Commercial banks
 Bangkok Bank
 Bank of Ayudhya
 CIMB Thai Bank
 ICBC Thai
 Kasikornbank
 Kiatnakin Phatra Bank
 Krung Thai Bank
 Land & Houses Bank
 Siam Commercial Bank
 Standard Chartered Bank
 Tisco Bank
 TMBThanachat Bank
 United Overseas Bank (Thai)

Retail banks

Foreign banks with Bangkok branch

Ranked by total assets as of 31 Dec 2006

Foreign banks (European) 
 ABN Amro
 BNP Paribas
 Deutsche Bank
 HSBC

Foreign banks (Asian) 
 Bank of China
 MUFG Bank
 Indian Overseas Bank
 Mizuho Bank
 Oversea-Chinese Banking Corporation
 RHB Bank Berhad
 Sumitomo Mitsui Banking Corporation

Foreign banks (North American) 
 BofA Securities
 Citibank Thailand
 JPMorgan Chase

Representative offices in Thailand 
American Express Bank
Resona Bank
ANZ
Bank of Baroda
Bank of New York
Bayerische Landesbank
Cathay United Bank
Chinatrust Commercial Bank (Taiwan)
Commerzbank
Credit Industriel et Commercial (CIC)
Credit Suisse
Daiwa Bank
DBS Bank 
EFG International
First Commercial Bank (Taiwan)
German Investment Corporation (DEG)
Hachijuni Bank
ICICI Bank
ING Bank
Intesa Sanpaolo
Japan Bank for International Cooperation
Merrill
MUFG Union Bank
Natexis Banque Populaire
Rabobank Nederland
Sanpaolo IMI
UBS
Wells Fargo
Westdeutsche Landesbank Girozentrale
Westpac
The World Bank Thailand
Yamaguchi Bank

Bank holidays
The Bank of Thailand (BOT) maintains the official list of banking holidays in Thailand.

References

Thailand
Banks
Thailand